Erica Lee Enders (born October 8, 1983 in Houston, Texas) is an American drag racing driver. Enders has won five championships in the Pro Stock class of the NHRA Camping World Drag Racing Series and she continues to drive full-time in that class.

Career
Enders started racing in 1992 at the age of 8. Her original Enders Racing Junior Dragster car is on display at the Wally Parks NHRA Motorsports Museum.

In 1993, Enders won the Division 4 Jr. Dragster championship in the 8 to 9 year old class, and in 1995 she was named Junior Dragster Driver of the Year. In her eight years of junior dragster competition, she had 37 career wins.

In 2000, at age 16, she advanced to her first national event final (Houston) to become the youngest NHRA national event finalist. She was named NHRA Sportsman Rookie of the Year.

In 2004, became the 35th woman in NHRA history to earn a national event victory, in Super Gas class at Houston. In 2005, she became the first woman to compete in the NHRA's Pro Stock Category since 1993, the first woman in NHRA history to qualify in the top-half of a Pro Stock field, and the first woman to reach a final round in Pro Stock (at Chicago). Enders achieved more round wins in 2005 than all other female drivers in NHRA Pro Stock history combined, and was a finalist for the “Road to the Future” award for the season’s top rookie.

In 2006, Enders became the first woman to qualify No. 1 in Pro Stock (at Heartland Park, Topeka, Kansas), and recorded another runner-up finish at the Gatornationals in Gainesville, Fla.

On July 2, 2012, Enders became the first woman to win in NHRA Pro Stock, beating four-time champion Greg Anderson in the finals at Route 66 Raceway in Joliet, Ill.  Her winning time was 6.627 seconds for the 1,320 foot run.

In 2012, Enders finished a career best fourth in the points in the Countdown to the Championship in NHRA Pro Stock and followed that up with a sixth-place finish in 2013.

It was announced following the 2013 season that Enders would leave Cagnazzi Racing and join Elite Motorsports for the 2014 NHRA Mello Yello Drag Racing Series, driving the team's new Camaro.

In 2014, Enders became the first woman to win the NHRA Pro Stock World Championship, winning six races for the year (an NHRA event win requires winning four, consecutive wins over competitors drawn from the sixteen quickest cars at that event), including the season-ending Auto Club NHRA Finals to clinch the title.

In 2015, Enders broke 2 records for female NHRA drivers. At Charlotte's zMax Dragway in September, she scored her 19th career win, surpassing a record previously held by Shirley Muldowney in Top Fuel for the most NHRA national event wins by a female driver. At the Texas Motorplex in October, Enders-Stevens claimed her eighth victory of the year, breaking Pro Stock Motorcycle rider Angelle Sampey’s single-season record of seven wins in 2001.

Enders won the NHRA Pro Stock World Championship for a second straight year in 2015.

In 2018 she also began driving a Pro Modified entry for Elite Motorsports, a twin turbo 2019 Camaro. She also holds the class record for fastest speed at 261 mph. In 2019, Enders barely escaped serious injuries when her Chevrolet Camaro caught fire at the end of a qualifying run in the NHRA Pro Mod class in Ohio.

Personal life
Enders is the older sister of Courtney Enders, who was a junior dragster driver; they both attended Cypress Springs High School. After winning her first national event in Pro Stock, her longtime boyfriend Richie Stevens, Jr. (also a drag racer) proposed.  The two were married on December 7, 2012.

Film
In 2003, Enders and her sister had their life story turned into a Disney Channel Original Movie, Right on Track. Erica was portrayed by Beverley Mitchell, while Courtney was portrayed by Brie Larson.

References

Female dragster drivers
1983 births
Living people
Racing drivers from Houston
Dragster drivers
American female racing drivers
21st-century American women